Chris Odom (born September 16, 1994) is an American football defensive end for the Cleveland Browns of the National Football League (NFL). He played college football at Arkansas State. Odom has also been a member of the Atlanta Falcons, Green Bay Packers, Salt Lake Stallions, Washington Redskins, Calgary Stampeders, and Houston Gamblers. With the Gamblers, he led the USFL in sacks and was named its Defensive Player of the Year in 2022.

Early years
Odom played high school football at Martin High School in Arlington, Texas. He recorded 32 tackles his senior year, earning all-district honors as a defensive end. He also participated in the school's track and field program.

College career
Odom played for the Arkansas State Red Wolves from 2013 to 2016. He played in all 13 games in 2013, recording 8 solo tackles, 9 tackle assists and 3 sacks. He played in all 13 games, starting 3, in 2014, totaling 12 solo tackles, 2 tackle assists, 1 sack, 2 pass breakups and 1 blocked kick. Odom played in 11 games in 2015, recording 1 solo tackles, 2 tackle assists and 3 blocked kicks. His three blocked kicks were tied for the third most in school history for a single season. He played in all 13 games in 2016, totaling 28 solo tackles, 25 tackle assists, 12.5 sacks, 2 pass breakups, 4 forced fumbles and 1 blocked kick, earning First-team All-Sun Belt honors. Odom participated in the College Gridiron Showcase in January 2017. His five career blocked kicks were the second most in school history. He majored in Sport Management at Arkansas State.

Professional career
Odom was rated the 41st best defensive end in the 2017 NFL Draft by NFLDraftScout.com.

Atlanta Falcons
After going undrafted, Odom signed with the Atlanta Falcons on May 1, 2017. He was waived by the Falcons on September 2, 2017.

Green Bay Packers
Odom was claimed off waivers by the Green Bay Packers on September 3, 2017.

On September 1, 2018, Odom was waived by the Packers.

Salt Lake Stallions
In late 2018, Odom joined the Salt Lake Stallions of the Alliance of American Football. Odom recorded 7 tackles, 2.5 sacks, 8 QB hits, and 2 pass knockdowns during his time in the AAF.

Atlanta Falcons (second stint)
On April 15, 2019, Odom signed a two-year contract with the Atlanta Falcons. He was waived on August 31, 2019.

Washington Redskins
Odom signed with the Washington Redskins' practice squad on September 2, 2019. He was released on October 8, 2019. He was re-signed on November 20. He was promoted to the active roster on November 30, 2019. In week 13 against the Carolina Panthers, Odom sacked quarterback Kyle Allen twice, one of which was a strip sack which was recovered by teammate Nate Orchard late in the fourth quarter to seal a 29–21 win. Odom finished the season with 10 tackles, 2 sacks, and a forced fumble in only 47 defensive snaps. He was released in February 2020.

Calgary Stampeders
Odom signed with the Calgary Stampeders of the CFL on February 2, 2021.  Odom made the practice roster and did dress for three games for Calgary, but was ultimately released on November 29, 2021.

Houston Gamblers
Odom was drafted by the Houston Gamblers in the second round (12th overall) of the 2022 USFL Draft.

Cleveland Browns
Odom was signed by the Cleveland Browns on August 5, 2022. He was placed on injured reserve with a knee injury on August 29, 2022.

Career statistics

Personal life
Odom's father, Cliff, also played in the NFL and was drafted by Odom’s current team the Cleveland Browns in the 3rd round of the 1980 Draft.

References

External links
College stats

Living people
1994 births
African-American players of American football
American football defensive ends
American football linebackers
Arkansas State Red Wolves football players
Atlanta Falcons players
Washington Redskins players
Green Bay Packers players
Players of American football from Texas
Salt Lake Stallions players
Sportspeople from Arlington, Texas
Calgary Stampeders players
21st-century African-American sportspeople
Houston Gamblers (2022) players
Cleveland Browns players